Our Lady of the Assumption is a Roman Catholic church in Fairfield, Connecticut, part of the Diocese of Bridgeport.

History

The Parish was founded in 1922. The present Norman Gothic Revival church was designed and erected between 1939 and 1940 by noted church architect J. Gerald Phelan.

References

External links 
Our Lady of the Assumption - website
 Diocese of Bridgeport

Christian organizations established in 1922
Roman Catholic churches in Fairfield, Connecticut
Churches in Fairfield County, Connecticut